Maria Sharapova was the defending champion but lost to Svetlana Kuznetsova in the semifinals.

Petra Kvitová won her second title at the event, defeating Kuznetsova in the final, 6–1, 6–2.

Seeds

Draw

Finals

Top half

Section 1

Section 2

Bottom half

Section 3

Section 4

Qualifying

Seeds

Qualifiers

Qualifying draw

First qualifier

Second qualifier

Third qualifier

Fourth qualifier

Fifth qualifier

Sixth qualifier

Seventh qualifier

Eighth qualifier

References
 Main Draw
 Qualifying Draw

Mutua Madrid Openandnbsp;- Women's Singles
Women's singles